John Deery is a British award-winning film and television drama director.

Early life
Deery was born in Birkenhead, Merseyside, across the river Mersey from Liverpool. Like many other directors, he started out as an actor, training at The Drama Studio, London. In between acting jobs he was a runner on commercials with some of the UK's top commercial directors. He then became a third and first assistant director before going to the National Film & Television School's Short Course Unit for Directors in 1996.

Career

Political film
One of Deery's other passions in life is politics. He worked extensively with the film and commercials director, Hugh Hudson, during the Labour Party General Election campaign of 1992. After graduating from the NFTS in 1996, Deery was commissioned by Peter Mandelson to write and direct a film for Labour called The Road to the Manifesto which launched Labour's 1997 General Election campaign. The film was a success, not only for its political message, but also for its theme song, "Things Can Only Get Better", which went on to become Labour's Election anthem. Since then Deery has made many other films for the Labour Party as well as several films for trade unions in the UK.

Conspiracy of Silence
Coming from an Irish-Catholic background, Deery believed that enforced celibacy was a 'time bomb waiting to go off' in the Catholic Church and began researching his first feature film, Conspiracy of Silence, which he wrote and directed. Cast includes: Academy Award-winner Brenda Fricker, Hugh Bonneville, Chris O'Dowd, John Lynch, Jonathan Forbes, Jason Barry, Sean McGinley, Fintan McKeown, Jim Norton and Hugh Quarshie.

The movie won many international awards including the U.S. National Board of Review of Motion Pictures' Freedom of Expression Award in 2004, which it shared with Michael Moore's Fahrenheit 9/11 and Mel Gibson's The Passion of the Christ. Deery was also nominated for Best Film Director at the Irish Film Awards in 2003. The screenplay was developed at the Sundance Screenwriters' Lab in Utah and won the Hartley-Merrill International Screenwriting Award presented to Deery at the Cannes Film Festival in 2001.

The film was invited to be shown at many film festivals in 2003 to be in Competition and/or Official Selection including: Taormina, Italy (first public screening, June 2003), Moscow International Film Festival, Opening Night film at the Galway Film Festival, Ireland, Montreal Film Festival, Hamburg Film Festival, Warsaw Film Festival where it won a Special Jury Award, Dinard Festival of British Cinema, France, and the American Film Institute (AFI) Festival in Los Angeles. It received an art house release in the United States but, so far, has not been released in the UK.

The film was screened in September 2010, two days before Pope Benedict XV's visit to the UK, at the Odeon West End in London's Leicester Square, where it formed the backdrop to a public debate about priestly celibacy in the Roman Catholic Church.  Speakers included the Bishop of Nottingham, comedian Frank Skinner and Baroness Helena Kennedy QC.

Conspiracy of Silence was re-launched at the Berlin International Film Festival in February 2014 by a new US boutique sales company, Angel Grace Films, headed by Michael Fister.

Television
Since Conspiracy of Silence, Deery has also directed several big dramas for television including If I Had You, a 2-hour single film for ITV1, starring Sarah Parish and Paul McGann which was screened in 2006.  He also directed two 90-minute specials of the hit UK comedy/drama series, Fat Friends starring James Corden, Ruth Jones and Alison Steadman.

Underground Ernie
Alongside his film and television drama career, Deery founded Joella Productions in 2002, an animation production company which created Underground Ernie.  Underground Ernie is a children's CGI animation series, based around a fictional underground railway service called 'International Station which is run by station supervisor, Ernie, played by Gary Linekar. It aired on BBC Cbeebies and BBC Two in the UK between June 2006 and December 2009 and achieved some of the highest viewing figures for the channel.

Future projects
Deery has developed a film slate for his own production company Joejack Entertainment.

Filmography

Awards and nominations

References

External links

Living people
Year of birth missing (living people)
English film directors
People from Birkenhead
Alumni of the National Film and Television School